Sun Go Nova is the third solo extended play (EP) by American rapper and producer Denmark Vessey. It was released on April 20, 2018 via Mello Music Group. The EP is supported by three singles: "Sun Go Nova", "Trustfall" and "Sellout".

Background
The instrumental for the track "Sellout" was originally produced for Vince Staples by Earl Sweatshirt in 2013. It was featured in the 2014 mini documentary Earl Sweatshirt and Vince Staples - Inside the Beat - Ep. 1.

Track listing

References

External links
 Sun Go Nova | Denmark Vessey on Bandcamp
 Sun Go Nova by Denmark Vessey on iTunes

2018 EPs
Mello Music Group albums
Albums produced by Knxwledge
Albums produced by Earl Sweatshirt